Major General John Craig Lawrence  (born 18 October 1963), known as Craig Lawrence or J. C. Lawrence, is a retired British Army officer whose last appointment was as the Director of Joint Warfare at the Directorate of Joint Warfare. He is now an author and lecturer at the Royal College of Defence Studies.

Lawrence was educated at St Peter's School, York and Durham University, where he read engineering. Commissioned into the 2nd King Edward VII's Own Gurkha Rifles (The Sirmoor Rifles), he joined this unit in 1987 after finishing university. According to his personal website, he has served in a variety of regimental and staff appointments. As a Brigadier, he served in Afghanistan as the director of the International Security Assistance Force's Election Support Cell and was awarded the Afghan Ministry of the Interior's Honour and Service Medal.

Lawrence was made a Member of the Order of the British Empire in the 2001 New Year Honours. He was upgraded to Commander of the order in 2013.

Lawrence's first book was a commemorative history of the Gurkhas titled The Gurkhas: 200 Years of Service to the Crown and was published on 30 April 2015.  The second, titled The Legacy, is an action-adventure novel and was published on 21 May 2015.

References

1963 births
Living people
21st-century British writers
British Army major generals
Commanders of the Order of the British Empire
Royal Gurkha Rifles officers
Alumni of University College, Durham
People educated at St Peter's School, York
British Army personnel of the War in Afghanistan (2001–2021)